Lubbock Independent School District was established in 1907. Accredited by the Texas Education Agency, Lubbock ISD is the largest school district that serves the city of Lubbock, Texas (USA). Those properties include 61 campuses including 37 elementary schools (Grades Pre-K - 5), 4 early childhood schools, 11 middle schools (Grades 6–8), 4 high schools (Grades 9–12), 2 special purpose, and three alternative campuses.

Lubbock ISD facilities include an Advanced Technology Center for the teaching of computer operations and programming. The ATC also instructs students in Iron and Wood construction, and automobile technology.

The district also features an Aquatic Center. Schools use this Olympic indoor facility across west Texas for swimming and diving competitions. It also trains all third-grade students about water safety during a class time at their school. The Aquatic Center also offers special water fitness instruction for the staff of Lubbock ISD.

In 2009, the school district was rated "academically acceptable" by the Texas Education Agency.

Schools

5 High Schools (Grades 9–12)
Estacado High School
Coronado High School
Lubbock High School
Talkington School for Young Women Leaders
Monterey High School

10 Middle Schools (Grades 6–8)
 Atkins Middle School
 Cavazos Middle School
 Dunbar College Preparatory Academy 
 Evans Middle School
 Hutchinson Middle School
 Irons Middle School
 Mackenzie Middle School
 O.L. Slaton Middle School
 McCool Academy
 Talkington School for Young Women Leaders

37 Elementary Schools (Grades Pre-K - 5)
Alderson Elementary School
Bayless Elementary School
Bean Elementary School
Brown Elementary School
Centennial Elementary School
Hardwick Elementary School
Harwell Elementary School
Hodges Elementary School
Honey Elementary School
Maedgen Elementary School
McWhorter Elementary School
Miller Elementary School
Overton Elementary School
Parsons Elementary School
Ramirez Charter School
Roberts Elementary School
Rush Elementary School
Smith Elementary School
Stewart Elementary School
Waters Elementary School
Wester Elementary School
Wheelock Elementary School
Whiteside Elementary School
Williams Elementary School
Wilson (Roscoe Wilson) Elementary School
Wolffarth Elementary School

References

External links

Lubbock ISD

 
School districts in Lubbock County, Texas
School districts established in 1907
1907 establishments in Texas